Natalie Toro is an American singer and actress for stage, television, and film.

Early life and education
Toro was born in Bronx, NY, where her parents both immigrated to from Puerto Rico. She debuted at the Apollo Theater at the age of five. Later on, she studied piano and voice at the pre-college division of Manhattan School of Music and the High School of Music and Art until the age of 18. She attended the Boston Conservatory of Music earning a BFA in Musical Theater.

Career
In 1999, Toro began a long journey with A Tale of Two Cities, a musical by Jill Santoriello. In 2002, she performed the role of Madame Defarge for the concept recording of the musical. In 2010, she reunited with many members of the Broadway Cast to record the “International Studio Cast Recording”, as well as a DVD of a semi-staged highlights concert of the musical.

In 2004, she began to tour with Jesus Christ Superstar, both while Sebastian Bach was on the tour and after he left. In 2007, she was cast in the Broadway musical adaptation of A Tale of Two Cities in Sarasota, Florida at the Asolo Repertory Theatre. She received a 2007 Sarasota Magazine Award for Best Supporting Theatre Actress.  Broadway previews in New York began on August 19, 2008 at the Al Hirschfeld Theatre, with an official opening of September 18. She remained in the show until it closed on November 16, 2008.

On November 23, 2008, Toro released her second solo-CD, which was self-titled "Natalie Toro".

Theatrical Credits

Broadway
A Tale of Two Cities, Madame Defarge
Les Misérables, Eponine
A Christmas Carol (Madison Square Garden Productions)

Off-Broadway
Zombie Prom (off-Broadway)

National Tour
Cats, Grizabella
Evita, Evita Peron
Jesus Christ Superstar, Mary Magdalene
In the Heights, Camila Rosario

Theatre Awards
 2009: 2008-09 BroadwayWorld Fan Theatre Awards for Best Featured Actress (Finalist/Nominated) - Madame DeFarge, A Tale of Two Cities
 2008: Sarasota Magazine Theatre Award for Best Featured Actress (WIN) - Madame DeFarge, A Tale of Two Cities
 1999: J. Jefferson Theatre Award (Chicago) for Best Actress (Nominated) - Evita in Evita

References

External links
A Tale of Two Cities

People from the Bronx
American people of Puerto Rican descent

Actresses from New York City
American musical theatre actresses
Singers from New York City
Living people
Boston Conservatory at Berklee alumni
Year of birth missing (living people)
American actresses of Puerto Rican descent
Puerto Rican stage actresses